Trerose is a hamlet north of Mawnan, Cornwall, England, United Kingdom.

References

Hamlets in Cornwall